Saint-Remy-en-l'Eau is a commune in the Oise department in northern France.

Transport 

The D101, D158 and D916 roads pass through the commune. Saint-Remy-en-l'Eau has a train station on the outskirts of the village, on the line from Creil to Amiens.

See also
Communes of the Oise department

References

Communes of Oise